Veselka Pevec is a Slovenian Paralympic sport shooter. She represented Slovenia at the 2016 Summer Paralympics and she won the gold medal in the mixed 10 metre air rifle standing SH2 event.

At age 18 she was shot six times by her boyfriend and she became paraplegic as a result.

References

External links 
 

Living people
Year of birth missing (living people)
Place of birth missing (living people)
Slovenian female sport shooters
Shooters at the 2016 Summer Paralympics
Medalists at the 2016 Summer Paralympics
Paralympic bronze medalists for Slovenia
Paralympic medalists in shooting
Paralympic shooters of Slovenia
21st-century Slovenian women